Kohtla-Nõmme is a borough in Toila Parish, in Ida-Viru County, in northeastern Estonia. It had a population of 1,047 (as of 1 January 2009) and an area of 4.64 km².

In 1930s New Consolidated Gold Fields opened a shale oil extraction complex at Kohtla-Nõmme. In 1937, the company opened the Kohtla underground mine. After the occupation of Estonia by the Soviet Union, the company was nationalized in 1940. The Kohtla-Nõmme shale oil extraction complex continued to operate until 1961. The underground mine stayed operational until 2001. After that the Estonian Mining Museum was opened at the site.

See also
New Consolidated Gold Fields
Kohtla-Nõmme TV Mast

References

External links
 Official website 
 Kohtla-Nõmme TV Mast

Boroughs and small boroughs in Estonia
Municipalities of Estonia
Populated places in Ida-Viru County
Kreis Wierland